Dobromir Dimitrov (born ) is a former Bulgarian male volleyball player. He was part of the Bulgaria men's national volleyball team. He competed with the national team at the 2012 Summer Olympics in London, Great Britain. He played now in Club Arman Ardakan. He is in a relationship with former Miss Bulgaria Nansi Karaboycheva, marrying her in the summer of 2018.

See also
 Bulgaria at the 2012 Summer Olympics

References

1991 births
Living people
Bulgarian men's volleyball players
Place of birth missing (living people)
Volleyball players at the 2012 Summer Olympics
Olympic volleyball players of Bulgaria
Volleyball players at the 2015 European Games
European Games medalists in volleyball
European Games silver medalists for Bulgaria
Bulgarian expatriate sportspeople in Romania
Expatriate volleyball players in Romania